VKN Menon Indoor Stadium is an indoor stadium situated in the city of Thrissur in Kerala, India. The stadium is owned by Kerala State Sports Council. The stadium is used for badminton, judo and weightlifting. The stadium has got a complete makeover for 35th National Games with maple wood flooring, advanced acoustics facilities, has 10 courts and stadium also has air- conditioned hall and modern arena lighting.

References

Indoor arenas in Kerala
Indoor arenas in India
Sports venues in Thrissur
1987 establishments in Kerala
Sports venues completed in 1987
20th-century architecture in India